The Norwegian Mixed Doubles Curling Championship is the national championship of mixed doubles curling (one man and one woman) in Norway. It has been held annually since the ??–?? season. The championships are organized by the Norwegian Curling Association.

List of champions and medallists

Medal record for curlers

References

See also
Norwegian Men's Curling Championship
Norwegian Women's Curling Championship
Norwegian Mixed Curling Championship
Norwegian Junior Curling Championships

Curling competitions in Norway
National curling championships

Mixed doubles curling
Curling